Tetraethylammonium iodide is a quaternary ammonium compound with the chemical formula  C8H20N+I−. It has been used as the source of tetraethylammonium ions in pharmacological and physiological studies, but is also used in organic chemical synthesis.

Chemistry

Preparation
Tetraethylammonium iodide is commercially available, but can be prepared by the reaction between triethylamine and ethyl iodide.

Structure
The crystal structure of tetraethylammonium iodide has been determined.  The crystal structure is a distorted wurtzite lattice.  At the nitrogen atom, the coordination is a flattened tetrahedron.  The N−C−C angle is slightly larger than the tetrahedral angle.

Synthetic applications
Examples include:
 Stereoselective formation of (Z)-diiodoalkenes by treatment of alkynes with ICl in the presence of tetraethylammonium iodide.
 2-Hydroxyethylation (attachment of −CH2−CH2−OH) by ethylene carbonate of carboxylic acids and certain heterocycles bearing an acidic N-H. For example, benzoic acid is converted to the ester, 2-hydroxyethyl benzoate, by treatment with ethylene carbonate in the presence of tetraethylammonium iodide.
 Phase-transfer catalyst in geminal di-alkylation  of fluorene, N,N-dialkylation of aniline and N-alkylation of carbazole using aqueous sodium hydroxide and alkyl halides.

Toxicity
LD50: 35 mg/kg (mouse, i.p.); 56 mg/kg (mouse, i.v.)

See also
 Tetraethylammonium
 Tetraethylammonium bromide
 Tetraethylammonium chloride

References

Tetraethylammonium salts
Iodides